Cordless Recordings is a netlabel owned by Warner Music Group.  The label was founded in 2005 by Jac Holzman, who also founded Elektra Records and Nonesuch Records.

Affiliation with Rykodisc - present

In 2007, Warner Music Group's Rykodisc label formed a strategic alliance with Cordless Recordings.  This alliance was meant to give Rykodisc a greater presence in the digital media space and the flexibility to explore new means of artist development and distribution strategies. As of 2009, current Cordless/Rykodisc artists included Gliss, The Notorious MSG, Throw the Fight and Kennedy.

Artists on Cordless Recordings
First Wave (2005)
 Breakup Breakdown (2005 - 2006)
 Koishii & Hush (2005 - 2006)
 Dangerous Muse (2005 - 2006)
Second Wave (2006)
 Maven (2006)
 Roger Joseph Manning Jr. (2006)
 Plan B (2006)
 The Residents (2006)
 Skye (2006)
 Jihad Jerry & The Evildoers (2006)
 The Notorious MSG (2006)
 H.U.M.A.N.W.I.N.E. (2006 - 2007)
 Throw the Fight (2006, 2008)
 Kennedy (2006, 2009)
 Gliss (2006, 2009)
Third Wave (2007)
 The Dead Betties
 Freezepop (2007 - 2008)
 Jupiter One (2007 - 2008)
Fourth Wave (2008)
 The Callen Sisters (2008)
 Velvet Code (2008)

See also
 Lists of record labels

References

External links
 Cordless Recordings' Official Site
 Cordless Recordings' MySpace page
 Cordless Recordings' blog
 Rykodisc Official Site

American record labels
Warner Music labels
Netlabels
Labels distributed by Warner Music Group
Online music stores of the United States